List of state parks in the U.S. state of Kansas operated by the Kansas Department of Wildlife and Parks:

See also
List of U.S. national parks
Big Basin Prairie Preserve

External links
Kansas Department of Wildlife and Parks State Park Website

 
Kansas state parks